The Boom XB-1 "Baby Boom" is a one-third-scale trijet supersonic demonstrator designed by Boom Technology (dba "Boom Supersonic") as part of development of the Boom Overture supersonic transport airliner. Taxi tests began in December 2022.

Development
The design was unveiled in Denver on November 15, 2016, and it was initially intended to make its first subsonic flight in late 2017, powered by three General Electric CJ610 turbojets (a civilian J85), with subsequent supersonic flight testing at Edwards Air Force Base.

By April 2017, enough financing was secured to build and fly it. Its preliminary design review was completed by June 2017, with a switch of engine to the military version of the J85 to take advantage of its extra thrust. It was then anticipated that flight tests would start late 2018. First expected supersonic flight slipped to 2019.

By July 2018, the aerodynamic design was completed, the horizontal tail assembled, and the engines received. The Spaceship Co., manufacturer of Virgin Galactic’s vehicles, was announced as a partner for flight tests in Mojave, California. Flight tests were delayed again for 2019 due to challenging aerodynamics and further engine change; from the  J85-21 to the  J85-15.

The XB-1 design went through three sets of wind-tunnel tests. The first indicated that predicted calibration was off by 30%. The second set of tests confirmed accurate calibration, and a third set of tests confirmed design safety.
Tunnel testing finished in November 2018, including takeoff and landing with gear doors' impact on stability as well as supersonic inlet testing. These tests had taken a decade on Concorde. The carbon-fiber layup of the fuselage halves was to begin in early 2019 for final assembly of the forward fuselage at the beginning of Spring. With total investment rising to $200 million, Boom was funded for XB-1 flight-testing to the end of 2020.
At the June 2019 Paris Air Show, Blake Scholl announced the date for first flight was pushed out to 2020, six months later than previously planned after including a stability augmentation system for better safety at high speed and at take-off and landing.

In February 2020, with the completion of Boom's second simulator, tests began on XB-1 flight controls and system integration.
Static wing loading tests were carried out in March 2020, and the wings were mated to the fuselage in April with the aft fuselage nearing completion in May. Engines and landing gear were installed later in August and September 2020.

Testing 

On October 7, 2020, Boom rolled out the XB-1 in a promotional, with an announcement that the maiden flight was expected in 2021.
In early 2021, it was expected to be flight tested around September 2022.
On July 26, 2021, Boom began testing and evaluating a forward-looking vision system (FLVS) as part of preparations for flight tests of the XB-1. 

In January 2022, Boom began conducting engine run-ups using the XB-1, in preparation for taxi tests and the first flight later in 2022. In May 2022, ground testing was completed with engine run up done on all three engines. Undercarriage and flight systems were tested and deemed ready. Taxi runs and actual flight runs were expected in late 2022. Further delays  pushed the expected first flight to mid-2023.

Design

It has a planned two-crew cockpit, with only one seat being fully developed in the demonstrator, and features a chined fore-body and swept trailing edges. For thermal control, the environmental control system uses the fuel as a heat sink to absorb cabin heat.

One of the issues associated with this type of aircraft is external visibility while at close quarters, so Boom have a solution for this problem with introduction of a screen in center of the instrument panel, giving pilot unobstructed views regardless of attitude of plane. Also as part of its development, a flight simulator along with a flight test program was devised to help evaluate flight characteristics and provide feed back into the design processes.
The space for a second seat is taken up by testing equipment.

Materials
The XB-1 is constructed of lightweight composites, titanium and A286. Materials for the hot leading edges and  nose, and epoxy materials for cooler parts, are provided by Dutch TenCate Advanced Composites, high-temperature materials supplier for the SpaceX Falcon 9. The airframe will be primarily intermediate-modulus carbon fiber/epoxy, with high-modulus fibers for the wing spar caps and bismaleimide pre-preg for the high-temperature leading edges and ribs. The rear section of fuselage containing the engines is made from 90% titanium and 10% A286 stainless steel alloys.

Specifications (preliminary)

See also

References

External links
 

Prototypes
Proposed aircraft of the United States
Supersonic aircraft
Trijets